The Commandant of Cadets at the United States Air Force Academy is the officer in charge of the Cadet Wing. Under the Superintendent, the Commandant oversees all of the cadets' military training at the academy. The position of Commandant has traditionally been filled by an active duty Air Force brigadier general, although occasionally, the office holder has been a major general. Since reorganization from October 1994 through August 2006, the Commandant was "dual-hatted" as the commander of the 34th Training Wing.  In August 2006, the 34th Wing was redesignated Commandant of Cadets, a named organization.

List of commandants of cadets

References

Notes

References